Mark Willingham Gantt IV (born December 10, 1968) is an American actor, director, producer and writer. Gantt is best known for his role as Neal Bannen in the Streamy Award-winning web series, The Bannen Way. Gantt grew up in Stockton, California, and comes from a law enforcement family; he drew upon those family experiences as part of the backstory for the title character in The Bannen Way.

Career

Early career 
Mark got his start in the entertainment business working in the Art Department, Props and Production on features, TV and commercial projects, while training as an actor and director at the Beverly Hills Playhouse under Milton Katselas.

As an actor, he has worked with Brad Pitt in Ocean's Eleven and Burt Reynolds in The Hollywood Sign.  He has also worked in the TV shows Alias, Without A Trace, and Buffy The Vampire Slayer.

The Bannen Way 
"Since its January 6 premiere, the action web series The Bannen Way has raked in more than 13 million streams, making it the fastest growing property on Sony's Crackle digital video network. Loaded with crime, gadgets, sexy cars, salacious scenarios and high production costs, the 16-episode series is intended as a vehicle for Crackle to reach a demographic of men 18-34 years old. The Bannen Way also starred, Vanessa Marcil, Michael Ironside, Robert Forster, and Michael Lerner."

"We were tired of waiting for agents to give us a call," said Gantt. "The web allowed us to stretch the boundaries. We got to create a cool show that we wanted to be in that could allow studios to recoup their money."

The Bannen Way was designed as both a 16 episode web series and feature film and has been distributed on VOD, DVD, iTunes, Amazon and Internationally on Cinemax and Sony’s AXN Network.

The Bannen Way Success 
The Bannen Way was number six in Mashable's "The Top 10 Most Watched Web Series February 2010" by Visible Measures with 6,576,886 views.  The series was nominated for 7 awards for the 2010 Streamy Awards winning Best Drama, Best Director, Best Actor (Mark Gantt) and Best Editing.  Awarded Groundbreaker Award for The Bannen Way at the 2010 LA Webfest.

Other Works 
In 2010 Gantt directed two episodes of the branded series, Suite 7 with Shannen Doherty, Dexter’s Jaime Murray, Warehouse 13's Eddie McClintock  and in 2011, the award-winning short film Donor starring Trevor Algatt and Alexis Boozer.

Mark also teaches acting at the Beverly Hills Playhouse and workshops on developing web series with Creator Up.

Mark has been a speaker on several New Media panels at Banff World Media Festival, Digital Hollywood, NATPE, Tubefilter Writer’s Bootcamp, and X-Summit.

In 2011 Mark hosted the first annual NATPE Digital Luminary Awards in Miami, Florida.

September 2015, Lifetime premiered Mark's feature directorial debut, Murder In Mexico: The Bruce Beresford Redman Story, based on the true story of former Survivor producer Bruce Beresford-Redman who was convicted in Mexico of the murder of his wife, Mónica.

In April 2016 Mark directed Intricate Vengeance for Ron Howard and Brian Grazer's New Form Digital studio.  It was part of the 2016 Incubator program, a series to showcase and produce original scripted pilots.

Filmography

Film

TV Series/Internet Productions

Awards

References

External links

Living people
1968 births
Male actors from California
People from Stockton, California
Male actors from Los Angeles
Streamy Award winners